Fitwell is a company that offers mobile apps that provide coaching and personal fitness plans.

The company have collaborated with pro athletes: the live-action workout videos feature Croatian National Team Olympic Basketball Player Antonija Sandrić, Turkish National Team Pro Basketball Player Doğuş Balbay, Master Personal Trainer Burcu Kuş, Master Personal Trainer Murat Bür. The workouts are supervised by Turkish National Teams Performance Trainer Murat Can Üner. The Turkish National Team's Dietician Cenk Özyılmaz was the consultant for the meal planning functionality.

History 
Fitwell was created by Baris Ozaydinli and Ahmet Taha Sakar and was launched in October 2014 as a free mobile app. Personalized content is offered through monthly subscription. The Fitwell app is available on Android handsets, Android Wear, iPhone and Apple Watch. The app is compatible with Google Fit on Android and Apple's Health app on iOS.

In spring 2014, the company was started in Istanbul with seed funding and angel investment, and started development work.

In October 2014, Fitwell was launched in Turkey, available only in Turkish and on iOS. The Android version was launched in November 2014. The launch version allowed its users to follow a personal fitness plan generated by the app's algorithm. The fitness goals are predefined and focus on certain physical achievements such as losing weight, building up muscle or getting more active and flexible. Users can pick their own fitness goal, or, follow the fitness goal suggested by the app's algorithm.

In April 2015, the Apple Watch app was released. In the same month, the company announced that they had raised US$500.000 capital on an independent investment platform.

In August 2015, the global version was launched with the support of English language, Imperial units and Western cuisine for the meal plan.

In October 2015, following the launch of Google Fit by Google, Fitwell started to offer the option to connect with the Google Fit for tracking activities. In November 2015, an Android wear app was released.

In December 2015, Fitwell was added to the “Top Developer” list of Google's Play Store.

Fitwell was shortlisted at global tech start-up events such as TNW's Boost Program and Web Summit’s PITCH competition.

In March 2016, Fitwell was accepted to Microsoft Ventures Accelerator programme in London.

In September 2016, Fitwell received an investment from Founders Factory.

References

Fitness apps
Health care companies of Turkey
Mobile software
Android (operating system) software